Jung Min-woo (born 1 December 1992) is a South Korean footballer who plays as forward for Gimhae City FC in K3 League.

Career
Jung was selected by Suwon FC in the 2014 K League draft. He made his debut goal in the opening match of 2014 season against Daejeon Citizen.

References

External links 

1992 births
Living people
Association football forwards
South Korean footballers
Suwon FC players
Daejeon Hana Citizen FC players
K League 2 players
Association football midfielders